Michael Andre Waddell, Jr. (born January 9, 1981) is a former American football cornerback. He was drafted by the Tennessee Titans in the fourth round of the 2004 NFL Draft. He played college football at North Carolina.

Waddell has also been a member of the Oakland Raiders and Florida Tuskers.

Professional career

Florida Tuskers
Waddell was signed by the Florida Tuskers of the United Football League on August 25, 2009. He was released by the Tuskers before the season began.

References

External links
Tennessee Titans bio (archived from 2007)
North Carolina Tar Heels bio

1981 births
Living people
Players of American football from North Carolina
American football cornerbacks
North Carolina Tar Heels football players
Tennessee Titans players
Oakland Raiders players
Florida Tuskers players
People from Ellerbe, North Carolina